The springbokkie ("little springbok" in the Afrikaans language) is a cocktail shooter that is popular in South Africa. It is composed of crème de menthe (or substitutes) and Amarula. The drink derives its name from the country's national animal, and the colors from the team jersey colours (green and gold) of the South Africa national rugby union team, which is known as "The Springboks". The ratio of Amarula to crème de menthe can vary substantially between recipes.

The springbokkie ritual
Some insist that a special ritual should be performed before drinking this shot. The ritual involves placing both hands behind one's ears with the index fingers pointing up. One then stomps their feet on the ground, snorts through their nostrils and squeals, resembling how a real springbok behaves in the wild. Participants then lower their heads to the shot glass, pick it up using their front teeth and scull the drink.

There are several ways to perform this ritual. Some choose to add a story to the game:

"Are there any leopards?
(Everyone shakes their heads)
Are there any lions?
(Everyone shakes their heads)
Then get to the waterhole and drink!"

References

South African drinks
Shooters (drinks)